Thodu Needa is a 1965 Indian Telugu-language drama film written and directed by Adurthi Subba Rao. The film stars N. T. Rama Rao, Bhanumathi and Jamuna, with music composed by K. V. Mahadevan. It is a remake of the Tamil film  Karpagam (1963). The film was released on 12 May 1965, and emerged a commercial success.

Plot 
Dharma Rao is a good Samaritan and head of the village. He has a son Raja and a daughter Radha. Raja marries his classmate Rani, daughter of Nagaraju, a crooked and evil-minded person in the same village, who has an eye on Dharma Rao's wealth. Dharma Rao performs his daughter Radha's marriage with Gopi, an ordinary farmer with a noble character. Time passes, and Raja and Rani are blessed with a baby girl, but they neglect their child and she comes closer to Radha and Gopi. This irks Nagaraju as he knows that the little girl is the legal heir to Dharma Rao's wealth. He creates problems in the family by brainwashing and misleading Raja and Rani, who blindly follow his advice. Raja sends the legal notice to his father, asking for property settlement, and also separates the baby. Radha goes into depression. While saving the baby from being attacked by a bull, she dies. Gopi goes into depression, but Dharma Rao reconciles to marry his friend Collector Ananda Rao's daughter, Lakshmi. Though he marries her, he is unable to forget Radha and is reluctant to invite Lakshmi into his life. Lakshmi longs for the love and attention of both Gopi and the baby. Meanwhile, the estranged son Raja and Nagaraju conspire to swindle Dharma Rao. The frustrated Nagaraju decides to eliminate Gopi and sends goons to attack him, where Lakshmi comes to his protection and gets stabbed. Finally, Gopi realises Lakshmi's love, Nagaraju is arrested, Raja and Rani also repent of their mistakes, and the entire family is reunited.

Cast 
N. T. Rama Rao as Gopi
Bhanumathi as Lakshmi
Jamuna as Radha
S. V. Ranga Rao as Dharma Rao
V. Nagayya as Collector Ananda Rao
Nagabhushanam as Nagaraju
Ramakrishna as Raja
Geetanjali as Rani
Baby Shakeela as Viji
Raavi Kondala Rao as the doctor

Production 
Thodu Needa is a remake of the Tamil film  Karpagam (1963). S. V. Ranga Rao and V. Nagayya reprised their roles from that film.

Music 
The soundtrack was composed by K. V. Mahadevan.  Lyrics were written by Acharya Aatreya. Bhanumathi sang the original version of the song "Que Sera, Sera (Whatever Will Be, Will Be)" in the film with minor changes in the lyrics.

Release and reception 
Thodu Needa was released on 12 May 1965, and emerged a commercial success. Vasiraju Prakasam of Andhra Patrika appreciated the story, music, cast and direction of the film in his review. B. V. Rao of Andhra Janata reviewed the film as an enlightening film depicting sacrifice and selfishness. He appreciated the performances of the cast.

References

External links 

1960s Telugu-language films
1965 drama films
1965 films
Films directed by Adurthi Subba Rao
Films scored by K. V. Mahadevan
Indian drama films
Telugu remakes of Tamil films